Thomas Kennedy (died 18 September 1947) was an Irish Labour Party politician and trade union official.

He was elected to the Irish Free State Seanad in 1934 for 9 years and served until the Free State Seanad was abolished in 1936. He was defeated at the 1938 Seanad election. He was elected to the 4th Seanad Éireann in 1943 by the Labour Panel, and was re-elected at the 1944 Seanad election. He died in office on 18 September 1947.

His son Fintan Kennedy was also a trade union official and senator.

References

Year of birth missing
1947 deaths
Labour Party (Ireland) senators
Members of the 1934 Seanad
Members of the 4th Seanad
Members of the 5th Seanad
Irish trade unionists